A two-part constitutional referendum was held in Mauritania on 5 August 2017, having initially been planned for 15 July. Voters were asked whether they approve of proposed amendments to the constitution. Both proposals were approved by 86% of voters with a voter turnout of 54%.

Proposed amendments
The referendum was split into two questions on different proposed reforms. One covered abolition of the indirectly-elected Senate and its replacement with regional councils, as well as merging the Islamic High Council and the national Ombudsman into a 'Supreme Council of the Fatwa'. The second question covered national symbols, including a proposal to change the national flag by adding a red band at the top and bottom to symbolize "the efforts and sacrifices that the people of Mauritania will keep consenting, to the price of their blood, to defend their territory", as well as modifying the national anthem.

A proposal to allow President Mohamed Ould Abdel Aziz to run for a third term was dropped after protests in Nouadhibou.

Although 141 of the 147 members of the National Assembly voted in favour of the changes, they were rejected by the Senate in March 2017, with 33 of its 56 members voting against, including 24 members of the ruling Union for the Republic.

Campaign
Former President Sidi Ould Cheikh Abdallahi called for voters to oppose the changes, claiming it would be a "constitutional coup". The opposition coalition, the National Forum for Democracy and Unity, also rejected the changes. The official campaign began on 21 July.

Results

Constitutional reforms

National symbols

References

2017 in Mauritania
2017 referendums
August 2017 events in Africa
2017
Flag referendums